The Space Room Lounge & Genie's Too is a bar and restaurant in Portland, Oregon's Hawthorne district, in the United States. The Space Room Lounge was established in 1959 and "fused" with the restaurant Genie's Cafe in 2014. The Space Room has an outer space theme and a large patio. Elliott Smith frequented the bar. Willamette Week readers voted Space Room the city's best dive bar in a 2017 readers' poll.

See also
 List of dive bars

References

External links

 
 

1959 establishments in Oregon
Dive bars in Portland, Oregon
Richmond, Portland, Oregon